Rejalu (also Romanized as Rejālū) is a village in Jowzar Rural District, in the Central District of Mamasani County, Fars Province, Iran. At the 2006 census, its population was 47, in 8 families.

References 

Populated places in Mamasani County